The 1945–46 Rugby Football League season was the 51st season of rugby league football.

Season summary

Wigan won their fifth Championship when they defeated Huddersfield 13-4 in the play-off final. They had also finished the regular season as the league leaders.

The Challenge Cup Winners were  Wakefield Trinity who defeated Wigan 13-12 in the final.

Bramley, Broughton Rangers, Hull Kingston Rovers, Liverpool Stanley, Rochdale Hornets, Salford, Swinton, Warrington and Widnes returned following the Second World War. Workington Town also entered a team for the first time.

Jim Sullivan of Wigan ended his career this season as the all-time record scorer of goals with 2,867.

Wigan won the Lancashire League, and Wakefield Trinity won the Yorkshire League. Widnes beat Wigan 7–3 to win the Lancashire County Cup, and Bradford Northern beat Wakefield Trinity 5–2 to win the Yorkshire County Cup.

Championship

Play-offs

The Championship Play-off Final was played at Manchester City Football Club on Sat 18 May.  Wigan's scorers were:

Tries: Ashcroft 2, Cunliffe. Goals: Nordgren 2.

Challenge Cup

The final returned to Wembley following the end of the Second World War. Wakefield Trinity beat Wigan 13-12 in front of a crowd of 54,730. This was Wakefield Trinity’s second Challenge Cup Final win in three final appearances. Their centre, Billy Stott was awarded the inaugural Lance Todd Trophy for man-of-the-match.

European Championship

The tri-nation tournament was played between November 1945 and March 1946 as single round robin games between England, France and Wales. This was the fifth Rugby League European Championship, and was won by England on points average.

Match Details

Sources
 1945–46 Rugby Football League season at wigan.rlfans.com
 The Challenge Cup at The Rugby Football League website

References

1945 in English rugby league
1946 in English rugby league
Northern Rugby Football League seasons